The Octavia was an effects pedal designed for Jimi Hendrix by his sound technician, Roger Mayer. It reproduces the input signal from a guitar one octave higher in pitch, and mixes it with the original and added distortion fuzz.

Effect

The Octavia consisted of an analog electronic circuit, which included a frequency doubler, envelope generator and amplitude modulator, together with additional frequency-shaping filter circuitry. The effect generated varied depending on use. For example, a clean tone from an electric guitar produced ring modulated overtones (as heard on the guitar solo in "Who Knows" by Jimi Hendrix.)

History
The effect was used by Jimi Hendrix, and can be heard in guitar solos on the song "Purple Haze".  Hendrix preferred to call the device the “Octavio”, and it is often referred to as such.

After Hendrix's death in 1970 one of the original Octavias became the basis for the redesigned "Octavia (TM)", manufactured by Tycobrahe Sound Company in Hermosa Beach, California, during the mid-1970s.  A limited number of the devices were produced, and today a used one in good condition sells for over $1,000 on eBay.

References 

1967 introductions
Effects units